Callistochiton is a genus of polyplacophoran molluscs, alive today, of which fossils are known from the Pliocene period onwards.

References 

Neogene molluscs
Chiton genera
Miocene genus first appearances
Pliocene extinctions
Ischnochitonidae